Farrell (anglicization of the Irish Ó Fearghail) is a surname and may refer to:
 Farrell (surname)
 Farrell Lines, shipping company (acquired by Maersk)
 Farrell, Nevada, an American city
 Farrell, Pennsylvania, an American city
 Farrell (clothing label), fronted by Robbie Williams
 Farrells, an architecture firm
 Monsignor Farrell High School, private Catholic high school

See also

 Arsenio Farell (1921–2005), Mexican politician
 Farell Duclair (born 1972), Canadian football player
 Luis Farell (1902–1977), General of the Mexican Air Force
 Faryl Smith (born 1995), British mezzo-soprano
 Pharrell Williams (born 1973), American hip-hop artist